Weimar is a city in Thuringia, Germany.

Weimar may also refer to:

People
Bjarne Weimar Danish silversmith; whose father Evald Nielsen, also a silversmith, was a contemporary and peer of Georg Jensen
Jacintha Weimar (born 1998), Dutch football goalkeeper
Robert Weimar (1932–2013), German legal scholar and psychologist

Places
Weimar (Lahn), a town in Hesse, Germany
Weimar, California, United States
Weimar, Texas, United States

Other uses
Weimar Republic, government of Germany from 1918 to 1933

See also
Weimar Triangle, a diplomatic group consisting of Germany, France, and Poland
Weimar Institute of Health & Education, an independent Seventh-day Adventist facility
Classical Weimar (World Heritage Site), a UNESCO World Heritage Site
Ahnatal-Weimar, a district of Ahnatal, Hesse, Germany
Weimer (disambiguation)